Elbow Beach is one of the most popular beaches on the main island of Bermuda. Located on the southern (Atlantic Ocean) coast of Paget Parish, it is also home to one of Bermuda's most famous resorts, the Elbow Beach Hotel. Part of the beach is privately owned by the hotel for use by its guests; there is public access to the rest of the beach.

Elbow Beach appeared on an episode of The Sopranos.

References

Beaches of Bermuda
Paget Parish